The Cheshire County Cricket League is a cricket league based in England. It is the top level of competition for recreational club cricket in the Cheshire area and is a designated ECB Premier League.

The league was founded in 1975, and the twelve founder member clubs were Alderley Edge, Bowdon, Bramhall, Brooklands, Cheadle, Cheadle Hulme, Heaton Mersey, Macclesfield, Marple, Northwich, Warrington, and Winnington Park.  The clubs were divided into two divisions in 1995, by which time there were 24 clubs in membership, and since 1999 they have been divided into three divisions.  The league became an ECB Premier League in 1999.

The clubs competing in the 1st XI Premier Division for 2020 were intended to be: Alderley Edge, Cheadle, Chester Boughton Hall, Didsbury, Hyde, Nantwich, Neston, Oulton Park, Oxton, Timperley, Toft, and Widnes.  The 2020 competition was cancelled due to the COVID-19 pandemic.  A replacement competition was organised for the later part of the season when cricket again became possible, but with the winners not to be regarded as official league champions.

Winners
 

 

 

 * – denotes a shared title

Performance by season from 1999

References

External links
 Official website
 play-cricket website

English domestic cricket competitions
Cricket in Cheshire
ECB Premier Leagues